The 1997–98 A Group was the 50th season of the A Football Group, the top Bulgarian professional league for association football clubs, since its establishment in 1948.

Overview
It was contested by 16 teams, and Litex Lovech won the championship.

League standings

Results

Champions
Litex Lovech

Petev, Tsanev, Yurukov and Belyakov left the club during a season.

Top scorers

Source:1997–98 Top Goalscorers

References

External links
Bulgaria - List of final tables (RSSSF)
1997–98 Statistics of A Group at a-pfg.com

First Professional Football League (Bulgaria) seasons
Bulgaria
1